3 Storeys is a 2018 Hindi-language thriller drama film directed by Arjun Mukerjee starring Renuka Shahane, Sharman Joshi, Pulkit Samrat, Masumeh Makhija, Richa Chadda, Sonal Jha, Aisha Ahmed, Ankit Rathi and produced by Priya Sreedharan, Ritesh Sidhwani and Farhan Akhtar. The film was released on 9 March 2018.

Plot 
Mayanagar is a three-storied chawl in Mumbai. Flory Mendonca, a Catholic widow, wants to give away a part of her house but does not have buyers due to its high price. Finally Vilas, who is eager to take a house near station, buys it. Whereas in the same building, Varsha is facing daily abuse from her unemployed and alcoholic husband. On the other hand, she still has feelings for her past lover, Shankar, and bonds well with her neighbour and tends her little son. Suhail and Malini fall in love being from different faiths much to the chagrin of their parents. On the ground floor lives glamorous Leela, who sends seductive vibes towards men around. The lives of the people living in Mayanagar do not seem to be what it is, as there are hidden secrets. At the end, it is revealed that Leela was actually the author of all the three stories...

In the first part, we see Flory attending a prospect buyer, Vilas, who is frustrated looking for accommodation in Mumbai. Vilas does not fuss a lot on hearing the exorbitant price charged by her. Later, she goes inside to make tea for them. Vilas sees some family pictures and inquires further. She tells him about her son who had a habit of stealing, and she used to defend him from other members of the chawl and his father. Time passes and one day at a wedding function in the chawl, she finds her son bludgeoned and in his dying state some precious diamonds to hide. They are not able to save him, police does not get anything after searching. She learns that that night her son was accompanied in the robbery, but the others escaped, but he was caught.

While hearing the story, Vilas becomes anxious and after putting sugar in his tea starts gulping it, while drenched in sweat. Flory reveals to his inquiry that she never got to meet that person who escaped and told the police about her son's location, "But I knew he would come to take those diamonds, because who will pay such a large amount of money for this small house in this chawl". It is revealed that Vilas is the cheater and has drunk poisonous tea and dies. Flory buries him in the floor matting of her house, and has avenged her son. Now she can leave this wretched house.

Then, we focus on the life of the woman who has been tortured by her husband. We see her life before marriage, where Varsha and Shankar were in love, and one day, after compelling her parents, she asks him to propose to her. Her father tells her if he does not come, he will marry her wherever he wants, and then he will hear no excuse in the name of love or career. Shankar doesn't come that day.

She has a very beautiful relation with her neighbor who sympathises with her. She invites her to dinner as her husband is coming. She goes there only to see Shankar being her husband. They greet each other and Shankar sees how pathetic and toxic her husband is. While he is leaving, they clarify the argument only to know that Shankar understood the wrong address to meet her with similar names. They move on with guilt. Flory bequeaths her plot to Varsha where she settles down to embark upon a life of independence.

Then, we see Suhail with his father, mother and many sisters, who hails from a Muslim family, and Malini, a single daughter of a very pitiful mother. They are madly in love, and decide to elope which they successfully do. While they are away, Malini's mother reaches Suhail's house and asks for help. We are shown that Suhail's father has an intimate relation with her. While the lovers are caught, they are told that Suhail and Malini are children from the same father and that Malini's mother was in an unrequited affair with him. But she had to withdraw as he was married to a Muslim woman. This breaks them to the core.

The element of suspense and surprise is saturated in the this framed story, where episodes leads to episodes.

None other than Leela, she is herself attractive and divine as Maya, but the Maya ceases when we are shown a simple Leela sitting on a wheelchair, holding a newspaper with headline that an anonymous author has written a beautiful story about people of Mayanagar, followed by literary reviews which are spectacular.

Leela then shows us the reality which she has doctored to make a fictional narrative that folds human's dark realities along with their intimacy with love.

Varsha comes on her scooter while her husband is sitting behind, they are a lovely couple with Varsha being dominant, not tortured at all, and Suhail and Malini are just friends, while Flory is nowhere to be evil.

Cast 
Renuka Shahane as Flory Mendonca
Sharman Joshi as Shankar Varma
Pulkit Samrat as Vilas Naik
Masumeh Makhija as Varsha Atre (Joshi)
Richa Chadda as Leela
Sonal Jha as Malini's mother
Aisha Ahmed as Malini Mathur
Ankit Rathi as Suhail Ansari
Laksh Singh as Dominic
Himanshu Malik as Policeman Ganpatrao

Soundtrack

The music of the film has been composed by Clinton Cerejo and Amjad Nadeem while lyrics are penned by Puneet Krishna, Alaukik Rahi, Amjad Nadeem, Shellee and Pushaan Mukherjee. The first song of the film Bas Tu Hai which is sung by Arijit Singh and Jonita Gandhi was released on 14 February 2018 on the occasion of Valentines Day. The second track of the film titled as Raasleela which is sung by Sumedha Karmahe was released on 21 February 2018. The third song to be released was Azaadiyaan which is sung by Clinton Cerejo and Bianca Gomes was released on 27 February 2018. The soundtrack album of the film consists of 4 songs and was officially released by Zee Music Company on 27 February 2018.

Critical reception

Lasyapriya Sundaram of The Times of India gave the film a rating of 3.5 out of 5 saying that, "3 Storeys cleverly demonstrates the art of skillfully telling a story wherein all the loose ends of a plot are tied together into a neat whole." Saibal Chatterjee of NDTV praised the performances of the actors specially Renuka Shahane but found the conclusion of the story to be weak. The critic gave the film a rating of 2.5 out of 5 and said that, "For all its flaws, 3 Storeys is still worth watching because it seeks to engage with the audience in a manner that is anything but run of the mill." Rajeev Masand of News18 gave the film a rating of 2.5 out of 5 saying that "it's a half-baked experiment with a few shining moments." Sweta Kausal of Hindustan Times gave the film a rating of 2.5 out of 5 saying that, "It is a film that weaves together thriller, love story, social issues, realities and life all in one package, without being too messy. The actors’ brilliant performances are added bonus."

Shubhra Gupta of The Indian Express gave the film a rating of 2.5 out of 5 saying that the movie "comes off nice in bits but uneven overall. Everyone plays it quite competently, despite the predictable beats." Rohit Bhatnagar of Deccan Chronicle was impressed with the performances of all actors and felt Renuka Shahane's act was "flawless." The critic gave the film a rating of 3 out of 5 and said that, "With predictable moments scattered all over the film, debutant director Arjun Mukherjee still takes a brave attempt of making an unconventional thriller." Udita Jhunjhunwala of Live Mint reviewed the film saying that, "Arjun Mukherjee's film has some convincing performances but is tonally inconsistent." Suparno Sarkar of IBTimes gave the film a rating of 3 out of 5 saying that, "3 Storeys is an unconventional drama that could have been much better."

References

External links 
 
 

Indian thriller drama films
2018 thriller drama films
2010s Hindi-language films
Hindi-language drama films